Luis Sáenz Peña Dávila (2 April 1822 – 4 December 1907) was a lawyer and President of Argentina. He was the father of president Roque Sáenz Peña.

Biography

Luis Saenz Peña was born on 2 April 1822 to Roque Julián Sáenz Peña and María Luisa Dávila.

He graduated in law from the University of Buenos Aires, and participated in the constitutional assembly of 1860. He was a number of times a national deputy and senator. In 1882, he occupied a seat on the Supreme Court of the Province of Buenos Aires. Later he was employed as president of the Provincial Bank, director of the Academy of Jurisprudence, and had a seat in the General Council of Education.

On 18 November 1848, he married 
Cipriana Lahitte Bonavía (born 6 December 1829, Montevideo, Uruguay - died 23 October 1916)  in the Church of San Ignacio, in Buenos Aires.

Political office 
In 1882, he served as a member of the Supreme Court of the Province of Buenos Aires. Later, he served as president of the Bank of the Province of Buenos Aires. He was also several times a national deputy and senator.

Presidency 

Luis Sáenz Peña, a prominent Catholic leader, was anointed as a transitional president, after an agreement between the Roquismo and Mitrismo that prevented the electoral participation of the brand new U.C.R.

On 12 October 1892, Sáenz Peña was inaugurated president of the country. He began his mandate convinced that his mission was to finish getting out of the Panic of 1890. He decided not to contract new debts, and personally renegotiated the existing ones in London: the financial situation forced the bankers to accept the conditions imposed by the Minister of Finance, Juan José Romero, who got some cuts in the capital and a somewhat longer term. By mid-1893, the crisis could be considered over.

During his tenure, the Ministry of Public Works managed to expand the railway network, to the point that all provincial capitals — except La Rioja — were linked by rails. The cities of Buenos Aires, Rosario and Santa Fe finished their ports, and the capital opened the Avenida de Mayo, which for more than half a century would be the show window of the great city.

In 1893, Congress approved the creation of the National Charity Lottery, today the National Lottery, which became active in 1894.

In 1894, Law 1,894 was enacted, which yielded large portions of the Chaco National Territory to neighboring provinces, especially benefiting the Province of Santa Fe.

Revolution and resignation 
In 1895, the political situation became more unstable every day, due to the evident incapacity of the president; Sáenz Peña changed his entire cabinet of ministers several times, unsuccessfully seeking to avoid journalistic criticism.

The situation spread to the interior provinces, where on several occasions the governments were overthrown, thus increasing instability. Sáenz Peña, increasingly disoriented, tried all possible alliances, and finally - before the imminence of a radical revolution - appointed Aristóbulo del Valle Minister of War and Navy. This convinced him to disarm the National Guards, with the apparent aim of avoiding new revolutions, but a few days later the radical revolution broke out.

Sáenz Peña no longer controlled his ministers, who ruled according to Roca and Pellegrini's instructions. In mid-January 1895, all of them submitted their resignations en masse. Sáenz Peña submitted his resignation on 22 January, which was received with relief by public opinion. The government passed into the hands of José Evaristo Uriburu, who completed the term ending in 1898.

Death 

He died in Buenos Aires on December 4, 1907, at the age of 85. He is buried in the Recoleta Cemetery.

References

1822 births
1907 deaths
19th-century Argentine lawyers
Argentine people of Spanish descent
National Autonomist Party politicians
Presidents of Argentina
Members of the Argentine Senate for Buenos Aires Province
Presidents of the Argentine Chamber of Deputies
Members of the Argentine Chamber of Deputies elected in Buenos Aires Province
Vice Governors of Buenos Aires Province
University of Buenos Aires alumni
Burials at La Recoleta Cemetery
Patrician families of Buenos Aires